Germantown Power Plant is a natural gas fired, electrical peaking power plant located in Germantown, Wisconsin in Washington County. It is a five unit natural gas or #2 low sulfur fuel oil facility. Unit 5, which is powered by natural gas, is the primary unit, with the other four, powered by low sulfur fuel oil, being used during hours of peak energy usage. The plant was built in 1978 at a cost of $38 million. Natural gas capabilities were added in 2000. There is a 600,000 gallon storage tank on site for fuel, and natural gas is transported to the facility by pipeline.

Units

See also
List of power stations in Wisconsin

References

External links
Germantown Power Plant
We Energies

Energy infrastructure completed in 1978
Energy infrastructure completed in 2000
Buildings and structures in Washington County, Wisconsin
Natural gas-fired power stations in Wisconsin
Oil-fired power stations in Wisconsin